Bridgett may refer to:

People
 George Arthur Bridgett, English footballer
 Bridgette Karen "Bridgett" Kern, American worship musician and urban contemporary gospel recording artist
 Bridgett Riley, female boxer and motion picture stuntwoman
 Bridgett Zehr, American ballet dancer
 Thomas Edward Bridgett, English priest and historical writer

In business
Hanson Bridgett, American law firm

See also
 Bridget (disambiguation)
 Bridgette (disambiguation)
 Bridgit (disambiguation)
 Brigid (disambiguation)
 Brigitte (disambiguation)